The Windley River is a river in the Eyre Mountains, New Zealand.

See also
List of rivers of New Zealand

References

Rivers of Southland, New Zealand
Rivers of New Zealand